1836 Komarov is a carbonaceous Dorian asteroid from the central region of the asteroid belt, approximately 22 kilometers in diameter. It was discovered on 26 July 1971 by Russian astronomer Nikolai Chernykh at Crimean Astrophysical Observatory in Nauchnij on the Crimean peninsula. It was named after Soviet cosmonaut Vladimir Komarov.

Classification and orbit 

Komarov is a member of the Dora family, a well-established central asteroid family of more than 1,200 carbonaceous asteroids. The family's namesake is 668 Dora. It is alternatively known as the "Zhongolovich family", named after its presumably largest member 1734 Zhongolovich. The Dora family may also contain a subfamily.

It orbits the Sun at a distance of 2.3–3.3 AU once every 4 years and 8 months (1,697 days). Its orbit has an eccentricity of 0.19 and an inclination of 7° with respect to the ecliptic.

Physical characteristics 

Komarov is characterized as a dark C-type asteroid by Pan-STARRS photometric survey. It is also classified as a hydrated Ch-subtype in the SMASS classification scheme.

Diameter and albedo 

According to the surveys carried out by the Japanese Akari satellite and NASA's Wide-field Infrared Survey Explorer with its subsequent NEOWISE mission, Komarov measures between 21.55 and 25.40 kilometers in diameter and its surface has an albedo between 0.042 and 0.103. The Collaborative Asteroid Lightcurve Link assumes a standard albedo for carbonaceous asteroids of 0.057 and calculates a diameter of 21.16 kilometers based on an absolute magnitude of 12.1.

Lightcurves 

In July 2008, two rotational lightcurve of Komarov were independently obtained from photometric observations by astronomers Julian Oey and Peter Caspari. Lightcurve analysis gave a rotation period of 8.8015 and 9.695 hours with a brightness amplitude of 0.39 and 0.56 magnitude, respectively.

Naming 

This minor planet was named in honor of Vladimir Komarov (1927–1967), Soviet cosmonaut who headed the manned flight on the Voskhod spacecraft. He was killed when the Soyuz 1 space capsule crashed after re-entry on 24 April 1967, due to a parachute failure. The official  was published by the Minor Planet Center on 1 June 1975.

Notes

References

External links 
 Asteroid Lightcurve Database (LCDB), query form (info )
 Dictionary of Minor Planet Names, Google books
 Asteroids and comets rotation curves, CdR – Observatoire de Genève, Raoul Behrend
 Discovery Circumstances: Numbered Minor Planets (1)-(5000) – Minor Planet Center
 
 

001836
Discoveries by Nikolai Chernykh
Named minor planets
001836
19710726